Isabel Le Roux (born 23 January 1987) is a South African sprinter who specializes in the 200 metres.

At the 2008 African Championships she won the 200 metres race in a personal best time of 22.69 seconds. She also won a bronze medal in 4x100 metres relay.

In the 100 metres her personal best time is 1 seconds, achieved in April 2004 in Bloemfontein.

Achievements

External links

1987 births
Living people
Afrikaner people
South African female sprinters
Athletes (track and field) at the 2008 Summer Olympics
Olympic athletes of South Africa
Universiade medalists in athletics (track and field)
Universiade silver medalists for South Africa
Medalists at the 2009 Summer Universiade
Olympic female sprinters
20th-century South African women
21st-century South African women